Badminton at the 2015 African Games in Brazzaville was held between September 2–9, 2015.

Venue
This tournaments was held at the Gymnase Étienne Mongha, in Ouenzé, Brazzaville, Republic of the Congo.

Medal summary
The table below gives an overview of the medal table and result of badminton at the 2015 African Games:

Medal table

Results

Men's singles

Seeds

 1.  Edwin Ekiring  (semifinals)
 2.  Jacob Maliekal (winner)
 3.  Prakash Vijayanath (final)
 4.  Abdelrahman Kashkal (third round)

 5.  Ali Ahmed El Khateeb (quarterfinals)
 6.  Ahmed Salah (quarterfinals)
 7.  Enejoh Abah (quarterfinals)
 8.  Abdelrahman Abdelhakim (third round)

Draw

Finals

Section 1

Section 2

Section 3

Section 4

Women's singles

Seeds

 1.  Grace Gabriel (final)
 2.  Kate Foo Kune (winner)
 3.  Hadia Hosny (semifinals)
 4.  Shamim Bangi (second round)

 5.  Elme de Villiers (quarterfinals)
 6.  Doha Hany (third round)
 7.  Nadine Ashraf (second round)
 8.  Menna Eltanany (third round)

Draw

Finals

Section 1

Section 2

Section 3

Section 4

Men's doubles

Seeds

 1.  Andries Malan / Willem Viljoen (winners)
 2.  Ali Ahmed El Khateeb / Abdelrahman Kashkal (final)

 3.  Abdelrahman Abdelhakim / Ahmed Salah (quarterfinals)
 4.  Mohamed Abderrahime Belarbi / Adel Hamek (quarterfinals)

Draw

Finals

Section 1

Section 2

Women's doubles

Seeds

 1.  Nadine Ashraf/Menna Eltanany (quarterfinals)
 2.  Doha Hany/Hadia Hosny (quarterfinals)

 3.  Jennifer Fry/Sandra Le Grange (second round)
 4.  Michelle Butler-Emmett/Elme De Villiers (quarterfinals)

Draw

Finals

Section 1

Section 2

Mixed doubles

Seeds

 1.  Abdelrahman Kashkal / Hadia Hosny (semifinals)
 2.  Ali Ahmed El Khateeb / Doha Hany (second round)

 3.  Andries Malan / Jennifer Fry (winners)
 4.  Ahmed Salah / Menna Eltanany (quarterfinals)

Draw

Finals

Section 1

Section 2

Mixed team event

Group stage

Group 1

Group 2

Group 3

Group 4

Knockout stage

References

External links
 Individual event results
 Team event results

2015 African Games
All-Africa Games
2015
All-Africa Games